Trachelium is a genus of flowering plants in the family Campanulaceae.

There are at least three species.

Species include:
Trachelium caeruleum – blue throatwort 
Trachelium × halteratum  
Trachelium lanceolatum

Two other species, T. asperuloides and T. jacquinii, may be treated as members of genus Campanula.

Trachelium caeruleum is cultivated as an ornamental plant.

References

Campanuloideae
Campanulaceae genera